Carlos Santana Live is a 2004 live album by guitarist Carlos Santana, released with Santana as a solo performer.

Track listing
 "Soul Sacrifice (sic)" (Santana/Brown/Malone/Rolie)
 "Santana Jam" (Santana/Curcio)
 "Evil Ways" (Henry)
 "Medley: Let's Get Ourselves Together/Jingo" (Santana/Olantunji)
 "Rock Me" (Curcio)
 "Just Ain't Good Enough" (Curcio)
 "The Way You Do to Me" (Curcio)

2004 live albums
Carlos Santana live albums